Milligan Branch is a stream in Montgomery County in the U.S. state of Missouri. It is a tributary of Brush Creek.

Milligan Branch has the name of Elihu Milligan, an early citizen.

See also
List of rivers of Missouri

References

Rivers of Montgomery County, Missouri
Rivers of Missouri